Entre dos aguas may refer to:

 Entre dos aguas (album), an album by Paco de Lucía
 "Entre dos aguas" (song), an instrumental by Paco de Lucía
, a film by Isaki Lacuesta